Lassen, California may refer to:
Lassen, California, former name of Janesville, California
Lassen County, California